Francisco Manuel Geraldo Rosa (born 20 January 1993), known as Kiko, is a Portuguese footballer who plays as a left-back for  club Anorthosis Famagusta.

A Portugal under-20 international, he made his debut in the Primeira Liga with Vitória Setúbal in January 2012. He was loaned out to Académico Viseu for the 2015–16 season. He signed with English club Port Vale in July 2016. He returned to Portugal after one season in England, and joined Académico de Viseu. He signed with Arouca in May 2018, before moving to the Cypriot First Division with Olympiakos Nicosia in July 2019. He moved on to Omonia 12 months later and helped the club to win the league title in the 2020–21 season and the Cypriot Cup the following season. He switched to Anorthosis Famagusta in July 2022.

Club career

Vitória Setúbal
Kiko began his career with Vitória Setúbal, and was given his Primeira Liga debut by head coach Bruno Ribeiro on 6 January 2012, in a 1–1 draw with Académica at the Estádio do Bonfim. He returned to play for the youth team after Ribeiro was replaced as head coach by José Mota the following month, and made sporadic appearances over the 2011–12, 2012–13 and 2013–14 campaigns. He featured 13 times in the 2014–15 season under first Domingos Paciência, and then returning head coach Bruno Ribeiro. However, he was judged surplus to requirement by new head coach Quim Machado, and spent the 2015–16 season on loan at LigaPro club Académico Viseu. He briefly played under Bruno Ribeiro at Académico Viseu, though was initially signed by Ricardo Chéu. He scored three goals in 24 appearances for Académico Viseu, as the club finished in 17th place.

Port Vale
Kiko signed a two-year contract with EFL League One club Port Vale in July 2016 after being recruited by former Vitória Setúbal coach Bruno Ribeiro. He began the 2016–17 season out injured after damaging his Achilles in pre-season; his injury left Vale without a specialist full-back as Adam Yates also picked up an injury in pre-season. He made his first team debut for the "Valiants" on 30 August, in a 1–0 win over Derby County U23 in the EFL Trophy. However Ribeiro resigned in December, and caretaker-manager Michael Brown signed Scott Tanser to play at left-back, leaving Kiko out of the first team for the first six weeks of 2017. He left Port Vale following the club's relegation in May 2017 after he and Brown came to a mutual agreement to end his contract.

Return to Portugal
Kiko returned to Portugal and signed with LigaPro club Académico Viseu in July 2017. He made 23 appearances during the 2017–18 campaign as Académico posted a fifth-place finish.

On 30 May 2018, Kiko signed with LigaPro rivals Arouca. However Cypriot club Doxa Katokopias claimed that he had also signed a contract with them, and said they would pursue legal action with FIFA. He remained with Arouca, and made 31 appearances during the 2018–19 season, picking up ten yellow cards, as Arouquenses were relegated into the Campeonato de Portugal.

Olympiakos Nicosia
Kiko joined Cypriot First Division club Olympiakos Nicosia in July 2019. He scored two goals in 23 games during the 2019–20 season, which was abandoned due to the COVID-19 pandemic in Cyprus.

Omonia
He joined league rivals Omonia in July 2020. Henning Berg led Omonia to the Cypriot championship at the end of the 2020–21 season, though Kiko played just seven league games. Kiko featured 18 times in the 2021–22 campaign and was given a start by manager Neil Lennon in the final of the Cypriot Cup as Omonoia defeated Ethnikos Achna on penalties following a 0–0 draw. He left the club in May 2022.

Anorthosis Famagusta
Kiko remained in the Cypriot First Division as on 6 July 2022 he signed a two-year contract with Anorthosis Famagusta.

International career
Rosa won caps for the Portugal under-19 and under-20 teams, and was named in the squads for both the 2013 Toulon Tournament and the 2013 FIFA U-20 World Cup. He played three games in the Toulon Tournament, as Portugal finished in fourth place following a 2–1 defeat to France in the third place play-off at the Stade du Ray in Nice, France. He featured once in the U-20 World Cup, coming on as a half-time substitute in a 5–0 win over Cuba at the Kadir Has Stadium in Kayseri, Turkey.

Career statistics

Honours
Omonia
Cypriot First Division: 2020–21
Cypriot Cup: 2021–22

References

1993 births
Living people
Sportspeople from Setúbal District
Portuguese footballers
Portugal youth international footballers
Association football fullbacks
Vitória F.C. players
Académico de Viseu F.C. players
Port Vale F.C. players
F.C. Arouca players
Olympiakos Nicosia players
AC Omonia players
Anorthosis Famagusta F.C. players
Primeira Liga players
English Football League players
Liga Portugal 2 players
Cypriot First Division players
Expatriate footballers in Cyprus
Portuguese expatriate footballers
Expatriate footballers in England
Portuguese expatriate sportspeople in England
Portuguese expatriate sportspeople in Cyprus